Jagadish Bhalla (born 1 November 1948) is an Indian Judge and former Chief Justice of Himachal Pradesh and Rajasthan High Court.

Early life
Bhalla's father was a doctor who was posted as Chief Medical Officer in Nainital. Bhalla completed his earlier education there. He passed M.A. and LL.B. from Lucknow University in 1971.

Career
Bhalla was enrolled as an Advocate in the Bar Council of Allahabad High Court and practiced law in the Lucknow Bench of Allahabad High Court on Constitutional, Civil, Arbitration and Criminal matters. He worked as Special Counsel on behalf of the Government of Uttar Pradesh. In 1983 he became the Standing Counsel for the State government. He was Honorary Head of the Law faculty, D.A.V. College Lucknow, Member of the Executive Council of Lucknow University and King George's Medical University. In 1995, Bhalla was appointed a Judge of Allahabad High Court. In 2007 he was transferred to Chhattisgarh High Court thereafter appointed Chief Justice of Himachal Pradesh High Court. Justice Bhalla became the Chief Justice of Rajasthan High Court on 10 August 2009. He retired on 31 October 2010 from the post. From 22 March 2011 to 22 March 2016 he served as Chairperson of Punjab State Human Rights Commission.

References

1948 births
living people
20th-century Indian judges
Judges of the Allahabad High Court
Chief Justices of the Rajasthan High Court
Chief Justices of the Himachal Pradesh High Court
20th-century Indian lawyers
21st-century Indian judges
University of Lucknow alumni